This is a list of newspapers in French Guiana.

France-Guyane (Cayenne) francegyane.fr
Guyane la 1ère (Malakoff, France) la1ere.francetvinfo.fr

Magazines
Une Saison en Guyane (Cayenne) une-saison-en-guyane.com

See also
List of newspapers

References

French Guiana
Newspapers

Newspapers